Dursun Khvajeh Rural District is in the Central District of Nir County, Ardabil province, Iran. At the census of 2006, its population was 5,267 in 1,354 households; there were 5,021 inhabitants in 1,383 households at the following census of 2011; and in the most recent census of 2016, the population of the rural district was 4,132 in 1,354 households. The largest of its 18 villages was Virseq, with 827 people.

References 

Nir County

Rural Districts of Ardabil Province

Populated places in Ardabil Province

Populated places in Nir County